Nathaniel Irish House is a historic home located in the Queen Village neighborhood of Philadelphia, Pennsylvania. It is located next to the Capt. Thomas Moore House. It was built between 1763 and 1769, and is a -story, three bay brick rowhouse.  It has a two-story, attached rear building and a steep gable roof with dormers. The interior features seven fireplaces.  This and the adjoining houses were built by Nathaniel Irish.

It was added to the National Register of Historic Places in 1972.  It is located in the South Front Street Historic District.

Gallery

References

External links

Historic American Buildings Survey in Philadelphia
Houses on the National Register of Historic Places in Philadelphia
Houses completed in 1769
South Philadelphia